The National Debt Repayment Movement (The National Debt Redemption Movement) was a movement to restore national power between 1907 and 1908 to repay government bonds with public fundraising. It was started by Seo Sang-dong of Daegu on 30 January 1907. At that time the national debt was 13 million won.  At the movement's height in 1908, it had amassed 190,000 won.

The movement attracted national appeal, and many gave up their tobacco in order to help repay the national debt.  Women, including the kisaeng Aengmu, took a leading role in raising funds. The Japanese Government expected for the movement to subside. However, the movement later attracted the interest of the Japanese forces, who regarded it as a dangerous expression of Korean nationalism and sought to stifle and discredit it.

A large park in central Daegu is dedicated to the memory of the movement.

Background 
Japan, which had deprived the Korean Empire of diplomatic power, provided an anti-compulsory loan to the Korean Empire, but the Korean Empire was unable to repay the loan. In fact, the loans provided by Japan to the Korean Empire were used to strengthen Japan's dominance in Korea and reached 13 million won in 1907 (the first year of the Korean Empire). Japan tried to subjugate the Korean economy to Japan by providing a loan to the Korean Empire. As part of this, in 1905 (Kwangmu 9), Japanese financial advisor Megata was sent to Chosun to conduct a money reorganization project, and the banks of the Korean Empire were subordinated to the Bank of Japan, and gradually began to take over the economy of the Korean Empire. The loan offering began with this intention, and in the end, Korea, which owed a debt of 13 million won, was unable to pay it off. Accordingly, around 1907, the government debt compensation movement took place in Daegu and other places in Gyeongsang-do.

Significance 
From the beginning, the government bond compensation movement spontaneously took place in various places in pure patriotic loyalty, not under a unified nationwide command system. Because of this, they were not able to effectively respond to the Japanese imperialism and oppression maneuvers, and eventually became frustrated. Although the movement ended in frustration, its historical significance was great as one of the struggles for the restoration of national power.

Museum and Foundation
In 2011 a museum dedicated to the National Debt Redemption Movement open in the memorial park in Daegu. The museum contains historical documents related to the movement and provides exhibits on its significance and impact.

See also
History of Korea
Korean independence movements
Gold-collecting campaign

References
 "Resident General's Office Report on Political Conditions, and a miscellenea", June 22, 1907 (JACAR Ref.B03041513600) and July 31, 1907 (Ref.B03041513800).

External links

 National Debt Redemption Movement (Museum, Archive, Foundation/Association)

Economic history of Korea
Daegu